Herman Bastiaan "Bas" Eenhoorn (born 14 September 1946) is a Dutch politician and management consultant. A member of the People's Party for Freedom and Democracy (VVD), he was party chair from 1999 until 2003.

Eenhoorn served as Mayor of Schiermonnikoog (1976–1983), Voorburg (1983–1996), as well as Acting Mayor of Lansingerland (2007), Kaag en Braassem (2009–2010), Alphen aan den Rijn (2010–2012), Vlaardingen (2014) and Amstelveen (2017–2019). He became well known after giving press conferences in his function as acting mayor after the Alphen aan den Rijn shopping mall shooting on 9 April 2011. He studied social and economic geography with a specialisation in public administration at the University of Groningen.

Decorations

References

External links

Official
  Drs. H.B. (Bas) Eenhoorn Parlement & Politiek

 

1946 births
Living people
Chairmen of the People's Party for Freedom and Democracy
Dutch academic administrators
Dutch corporate directors
Dutch geographers
Dutch management consultants
Dutch nonprofit directors
Dutch nonprofit executives
Dutch public broadcasting administrators
Dutch trade association executives
Dutch urban planners
Economic geographers
Ernst & Young people
Mayors of Amstelveen
Mayors in South Holland
People from Alphen aan den Rijn
People from Lansingerland
Mayors of Schiermonnikoog
People from Vlaardingen
People from Voorburg
Officers of the Order of Orange-Nassau
Politicians from Groningen (city)
People from Schiermonnikoog
People from Wassenaar
People's Party for Freedom and Democracy politicians
Social geographers
University of Groningen alumni
Academic staff of the University of Groningen
20th-century Dutch civil servants
20th-century Dutch politicians
21st-century Dutch civil servants
21st-century Dutch politicians